Cheshmeh Sangi may refer to:
Cheshmeh Sangi, Eslamabad-e Gharb
Cheshmeh Sangi, Sonqor